Les Aventures de Pélée (The Adventures of Peleus) is a ballet in three acts and five scenes with choreography by Marius Petipa and music by Ludwig Minkus, with additional music adapted from works by Léo Delibes. The libretto by Marius Petipa is derived from the Greek Myth concerning the Goddess Thetis and the circumstances surrounding her marriage, arranged by Jupiter (or Zeus), to the mortal Peleus.

Revivals
Principal Dancers: Mathilde Kschessinskaya (as the Goddess Thetis), Pavel Gerdt (as Peleus), Olga Preobrajenskaya (as Cupid), Olga Leonova (as Venus), Lyubov Roslavleva (as Flora), Alexei Bulgakov (as Jupiter), and Sergei Legat (as Adonis).

There was only one full resumption of this ballet by choreographer Alexey Bogdanov.

References 

Ballets by Marius Petipa
Ballets by Ludwig Minkus
Ballets to the music of Léo Delibes
1876 ballet premieres
Ballets premiered at the Bolshoi Theatre, Saint Petersburg